Kven may refer to:

 Kven people, a Finnic ethnic group of Norway
 Kven language, the Finnic language spoken by them
 something from, or associated with, ancient Kvenland
 Kven Sea
 KVEN, an American radio station (1520 AM) licensed to Port Hueneme, California
 KVEN (Ventura, California), a defunct American radio station (1450 AM) licensed to Ventura, California

See also 

 
 
 Etymology of Kven
 Cwen (disambiguation)
 Cven (disambiguation)

Language and nationality disambiguation pages